George of Alexandria may refer to:

 George of Laodicea, bishop of Laodicea in 335–347, a native of Alexandria
 George of Cappadocia, Arian patriarch of Alexandria in 356–361
 Patriarch George I of Alexandria, ruled in 621–631
 Patriarch George II of Alexandria, ruled in 1021–1051